Gene Rockwell (1944–1998) was a South African singer. His 1965 rendition of "Heart" went directly to the top of the LM Radio Top 20.

History 
Gene was born Gert Smit in 1944 in the town of Krugersdorp in the then Transvaal province of South Africa. He died at the age of 53 years, on July 3, 1998, of cancer.

He won his first talent competition at the age of 15, in Durban's "Little Top". Still in his teens, Gene formed The Blue Angels, later to become The Falcons, in 1963, with whom he played guitar and sang his famous gritty-blues-style songs. The original line up of the Falcons were George Usher (lead guitar), Jannie Heynes (bass guitar), Clive Swegman (rhythm guitar), Frank Rickson (drums). They played many packed out shows, becoming a staple of the dance scene in South Africa, particularly Durban.

Gert Smit was an extraordinary musician, however he turned to crime in he's latter years, defrauding Suncol in Benoni in the East rand in 1984, thereafter he set up a 'office' at the Mariston Hotel in Claim street Johannesburg 'importing' Nigerian drug dealers by organizing Visas and marriages with poor African South African women.

Discography

References 
 Gene Rockwell - Heart

Notes 

1944 births
1998 deaths
People from Krugersdorp
White South African people
20th-century South African male singers